Puccinia sparganioides is a parasitic fungus that causes rust disease on plants, including Spartina alterniflora.

References

sparganioides
Parasitic fungi